Johann Schierl (born 26 May 1902, date of death unknown) was an Austrian footballer. He played in two matches for the Austria national football team from 1923 to 1924.

References

External links
 

1902 births
Year of death missing
Austrian footballers
Austria international footballers
Place of birth missing
Association footballers not categorized by position